The KPN Renewables Bangkok Open is a tennis tournament held in Bangkok, Thailand since 2016. The event is part of the ATP Challenger Tour and is played on outdoor hard courts.

Past finals

Singles

Doubles

References

External links 

 ITF search

KPN Renewables Bangkok Open
2016 establishments in Thailand
2016 disestablishments in Thailand
Tennis
Tennis
ATP Challenger Tour
Hard court tennis tournaments
May sporting events
Recurring sporting events established in 2016
Recurring events disestablished in 2016
Tennis
Tennis in Bangkok
Tennis tournaments in Thailand
Defunct tennis tournaments in Thailand